Olefin Conversion Technology, also called the Phillips Triolefin Process, is the industrial process that interconverts propylene with ethylene and 2-butenes.  The process is also called the ethylene to propylene (ETP) process. In ETP, ethylene is dimerized to 1-butene, which is isomerized to 2-butenes.  The 2-butenes are then subjected to metathesis with ethylene.

Rhenium- and molybdenum-containing heterogeneous catalysis are used. Nowadays, only the reverse reaction is practiced, i.e., the conversion of ethylene and 2-butene to propylene:
CH2=CH2  +  CH3CH=CHCH3   →   2 CH2=CHCH3

The technology is founded on an olefin metathesis reaction discovered at Phillips Petroleum Company. The originally described process employed catalysts molybdenum hexacarbonyl, tungsten hexacarbonyl, and molybdenum oxide supported on alumina.

References

Carbon-carbon bond forming reactions
Industrial processes